The Rising Sun is an Indian fortnightly magazine published by Dravida Munnetra Kazhagam.

History 
It was started in 1971 for carrying messages of Dravida Munnetra Kazhagam to other places. It was started at Kalaiwanar Arena. At that time, the editor of The Rising Sun was Murasoli Maran. After that it discontinued. In 2005, M. Karunanidhi restarted this magazine at Anna Institute but later it stopped for one more time. On 26 September 2021, M. K. Stalin re-released the magazine at the same institute.

References 

Dravida Munnetra Kazhagam